Noelani Pantastico (born May 4, 1980) is an American ballet dancer.  She was formerly a principal dancer with Pacific Northwest Ballet in Seattle and also danced at the Les Ballets de Monte-Carlo in Monaco.

Early life
Pantastico was born in Oahu, Hawaii, to a Hawaiian-Filipino father and an Australian mother, and is one of six children. In her early life, her family moved around in the country. She started training at the Central Pennsylvania Youth Ballet at the age of 11. She also attended Pacific Northwest Ballet's summer intensives for three years

Career
In 1997, Pantastico joined the Pacific Northwest Ballet in Seattle as an apprentice, and became a member of the corps de ballet a year later. She was named soloist in 2001 and, a year after dancing Aurora in Sleeping Beauty, a principal in 2004.

In 2008, she left PNB and joined Jean-Christophe Maillot's Les Ballets de Monte-Carlo in Monaco as a soloist, having previously danced Maillot's Roméo et Juliette at PNB. She was named first soloist a year later.

In 2015, she returned to PNB, again as a principal dancer. During her time in PNB, she has danced in Jewels, Cendrillon, The Nutcracker, Giselle, Crystal Pite's Plot Point and Penny Saunders's ALICE. She was also featured in the 1999 filmed version of PNB's A Midsummer Night's Dream.

In 2017, Pantastico choreographed Picnic for Sculptured Dance.

Outside of PNB, in 2004, she made a guest appearance at the New York City Ballet, dancing the second movement of Balanchine's Brahms–Schoenberg Quartet at NYCB's Balanchine Centennial. She also founded Seattle Dance Collective with fellow PNB principal dancer James Moore.

In January 2022, Pantastico announced her retirement and future teaching position at the Central Pennsylvania Youth Ballet.

Selected repertoire

Awards
1996 Regional Dance America/Northeast Scholarship winner
1997 Regional Dance America/Northeast Scholarship winner

References

External links
Noelani Pantastico official website

1980 births
American ballerinas
Living people
People from Oahu
Pacific Northwest Ballet principal dancers
Dancers from Hawaii
Prima ballerinas
21st-century American ballet dancers
American expatriates in Monaco
American people of Australian descent
American people of Native Hawaiian descent
American dancers of Asian descent
American people of Filipino descent
21st-century American women